Johann Sebastian Bach composed the church cantata  (God alone shall have my heart), 169, a solo cantata for an alto soloist, in Leipzig for the 18th Sunday after Trinity, and first performed it on 20 October 1726.

History and words 
Bach wrote the cantata during his fourth year in Leipzig, for the 18th Sunday after Trinity. The prescribed readings for the Sunday were from the First Epistle to the Corinthians, Paul's thanks for grace of God in Ephesus, and from the Gospel of Matthew, the Great Commandment.

The unknown author of the text concentrated on the love of God in movements 2 to 5 and added one movement about the love of your neighbour in movement 6, continued in the concluding chorale, the third stanza of Martin Luther's "". The poet connected the first recitative to the following aria by starting the two thoughts in the recitative by a related line from the aria as a motto, and ending both with the a recapitulation of the first line.

The only other extant cantata for the Sunday is the chorale cantata , composed in 1724. The three later cantatas, written within a few months, employ the organ as an obbligato instrument, possibly because Bach liked the combination of alto voice and organ registrations. A week later, Bach composed the famous cantata for bass solo, also concluded by a chorale. It is not known if Bach looked for texts suitable for a solo voice, or if texts were "clerically imposed on him", which stressed individual piety and therefore suggested to be treated as solo cantatas.

Bach first performed the cantata on 20 October 1726. It is regarded as part of his third annual cycle of cantatas.

Scoring and structure 
The cantata in seven movements is scored for alto, a four-part choir only for the closing chorale, two oboes, taille (tenor oboe), two violins, viola, organ obbligato and basso continuo.

 Sinfonia
 Arioso: 
 Aria: 
 Recitative: 
 Aria: 
 Recitative: 
 Chorale:

Music 
As in a number of other works, Bach reused some of his earlier works. The first movement, a sinfonia, and movement 5 rely on a lost concerto, perhaps for oboe or flute, possibly written during his time in Köthen (1717–23). That same concerto is the source of Bach's Harpsichord Concerto BWV 1053, composed around 1739. According to John Eliot Gardiner, it may have also served as an organ concerto for the new Silbermann organ in Dresden's Sophienkirche in 1725. Bach used the first movement of the concerto, in da capo form, as an extended instrumental introduction, assigning the solo part to the organ, the tutti to the strings and three oboes which he added for the cantata. The first vocal movement is an arioso, accompanied only by the continuo. Bach followed the careful wording of the poet by setting the lines from the following aria as a motto and conclusion of each thought as an arioso, the reflection which they frame as a secco recitative. The repeat of the essential line "" "acts like a rondo motif", according to Gardiner. In the aria, this line appears reminiscent of the arioso, but in reverse movement. As Gardiner observes: "It is a perfect example of Bach's skill in following admonitions by contemporary music theorists to 'grasp the sense of the text' (Mauritius Vogt, 1719) with the goal of 'refined and text-related musical expression ... the true purpose of music' (Johann David Heinichen, 1711)." The accompaniment of the virtuoso organ adds weight to the statement. Musicologist Julian Mincham interprets the "richly embroidered organ melody", which continues throughout the movement, as a "virtually continuous stream of goodness". A simple secco recitative leads to the second aria, which is again, like the Sinfonia, taken from the concerto, with the voice woven into the solo organ and the strings. According to Dürr, the aria is an example of "how a piece can gain rather than lose from its adaptation in the context of a new work". Another example is the Agnus Dei from Bach's Mass in B minor'. The text marks a farewell to love in the world: "" (Die in me, world and all your love).  The music of the aria, marked "Siciliano" as the slow movement of the harpsichord concerto, has been regarded as a "farewell to worldly life", in "a mood of heart-stopping intensity", also as a mystic contemplation of a heavenly love. The aria has been compared in character to the aria of the repenting Peter "" from Bach's St Matthew Passion.

After the love of God has been expanded in great detail in five movements, the commandment to also love one's neighbour is expressed in a short recitative, leading to the chorale, which asks the Holy Spirit to assist in doing so, "so that we might love each other from our hearts and remain of one mind in peace".

Recordings 
As a solo cantata, the work has attracted many conductors and singers who are not specialists in Baroque music to record it. Conductors have included Rudolf Barshai and Ludwig Güttler and singers Aafje Heynis, Birgit Finnilä, Jadwiga Rappé and Monica Groop. Andreas Scholl recorded it in 2010 with Julia Schröder leading as concertmaster the Kammerorchester Basel with Junko Takamaya, Michael Feyfar and Raitis Grigalis singing the chorale.

 J. S. Bach: Cantata No. 169, "Gott soll allein mein Herze haben", Aafje Heynis, Epic, 1958
 J. S. Bach: Cantatas BWV 157 & BWV 169, Diethard Hellmann, Kantorei & Kammerorchester der Christuskirche Mainz, Lotte Wolf-Matthäus, Cantate 1958
 Maureen Forrester sings Bach & Handel, Antonio Janigro, I Solisti di Zagreb, Maureen Forrester, Vanguard 1964
 J. S. Bach & Handel: Solo Cantatas & Vocal Works, Yehudi Menuhin, Bath Festival Orchestra, Janet Baker, EMI 1966
 J. S. Bach: Cantates BWV 161 & BWV 169, Frigyes Sándor, Chamber Choir and Orchestra of the Franz Liszt Academy of Music, Julia Hamari, Hungaroton 1966
 J. S. Bach: Das Kantatenwerk – Sacred Cantatas Vol. 9, Nikolaus Harnoncourt, Tölzer Knabenchor, Paul Esswood, Teldec 1987
 Bach Kantaten BWV 35, BWV 169, BWV 49 (Sinfonia), Hartmut Haenchen, RIAS Kammerchor, Kammerorchester Carl Philipp Emanuel Bach, Jochen Kowalski, Berlin Classics 1994
 Bach Edition Vol. 9 – Cantatas Vol. 4, Pieter Jan Leusink, Holland Boys Choir, Netherlands Bach Collegium, Sytse Buwalda, Brilliant Classics 1999
 Bach Cantatas Vol. 9, John Eliot Gardiner, Monteverdi Choir, English Baroque Soloists, Nathalie Stutzmann, Soli Deo Gloria 2000
 J. S. Bach: Complete Cantatas Vol. 17, Ton Koopman, Amsterdam Baroque Orchestra & Choir, Bogna Bartosz, Antoine Marchand 2002

References

Sources 
 
 Gott soll allein mein Herze haben BWV 169; BC A 143 / Sacred cantata (18th Sunday after Trinity) Bach Digital
 Cantata BWV 169 Gott soll allein mein Herze haben history, scoring, sources for text and music, translations to various languages, discography, discussion, Bach Cantatas Website
 BWV 169 Gott soll allein mein Herze haben English translation, University of Vermont
 BWV 169 Gott soll allein mein Herze haben text, scoring, University of Alberta
 Carol Traupman-Carr: Cantata BWV 169 Gott soll allein mein Herze haben analysis, Bach Choir of Bethlehem
 Luke Dahn: BWV 169.7 bach-chorales.com

Church cantatas by Johann Sebastian Bach
1726 compositions